The azalea is a flowering shrub.

Azalea may also refer to:

Places
Azalea, Oregon, United States, an unincorporated community
Azalea State Natural Reserve, a nature reserve in California
Isahaya Park or Azalea, a park in Nagasaki Prefecture, Japan
1056 Azalea, an asteroid

Ships
Azalea-class sloop, a class of minesweeping sloops in the UK Royal Navy including HMS Azalea (1915)
HMS Azalea (K25), a corvette in the UK Royal Navy
USS Azalea (1864), a Civil War armed tugboat
USLHT Azalea (1891) or USS Azalea, a lighthouse tender in the US Navy
USS Azalea (1915), a United States Navy ship

Sports
Azalea Open Invitational, a PGA Tour golf tournament last played in 1971
Azalea Stakes, a thoroughbred horse race in Miami Gardens, Florida
Azalea Trail Run, an annual road running event in Mobile, Alabama
Palatka Azaleas, a minor league baseball team based in Palatka, Florida, up to 1953

Arts and entertainment
Iggy Azalea, stage name of Australian rapper and former model Amethyst Amelia Kelly (born 1990)
"Azaleas", a Korean poem by Kim Sowol
"Azalea", a song by Boa Kwon
"Azalea", a song by Nano Ripe
Azalea, a subunit of Aqours from Love Live! Sunshine!!, a Japanese multimedia project
Azalea Berges, a character in Poison Ivy: The Secret Society, a 2008 made-for-television film
Azalea Kathryn Wentworth, protagonist of the novel Entwined

Publications
Azalea: A Magazine by Third World Lesbians, a quarterly published between 1977 and 1983
Azalea, a journal of Korean literature published by the University of Hawaiʻi Press

Other uses
Azalea (chimpanzee), a chimpanzee at the Korea Central Zoo that smokes cigarettes
Azalea Pictures, a film company responsible for B movies such as Mars Needs Women
Azalea (given name)

See also
Azala (disambiguation)
Azalia (disambiguation)
Azealia Banks (born 1991), American rapper